Ormen Lange is a natural gas field on the Norwegian continental shelf. The field is named after the famous longship Ormen Lange of Olaf Tryggvason, a 10th-century Viking king of Norway.

History
Production of gas began with three wells in September 2007.  The King and Queen of Norway attended the official opening of this project, delivered on time and inside budget, on 6 October 2007, at the football stadium in Molde. During the opening, King Harald officially opened the terminal which would supply Great Britain with enough natural gas to cover 20% of its total annual needs. 

The proposal to build the Langeled subsea pipeline, the world’s second longest subsea export pipeline, was approved in February 2003. The pipeline runs across the North Sea from Nyhamna to the Easington Gas Terminal near the mouth of the River Humber on the UK’s East coast.

Reserves
Recoverable gas reserves are estimated to be ~300 billion cubic meters.

Technical description
The Ormen Lange field has been developed without using conventional offshore platforms. Instead, 24 subsea wellheads in four seabed templates on the ocean floor are connected directly by two  pipelines to an onshore process terminal at Nyhamna. The field produces 70 million cubic meters of natural gas per day.

Total cost is estimated to reach 66 billion Norwegian kroner (around US$12 billion) by the time of completion.

The onshore facility at Nyhamna was designed by Aker Solutions Engineering in 2003-2007.

Natural conditions
Extreme natural conditions at the site (subzero temperatures part of the year, stormy seas, strong underwater currents, uneven seabed) put great demands on the technology used in the project. The Storegga Slides that occurred in the area about 8,000 years ago have been investigated, with the conclusion that the risk of recurrence is negligible.

Ownership and operators
Several companies share ownership of Ormen Lange.
Petoro AS: 36.4850%
Statoil: 25.3452%
Norske Shell: 17.8134%
DONG Energy: 14.0208%
ExxonMobil: 6.3356%

Ormen Lange was operated by Statoil during the development stage. On  30 November 2007, Norske Shell took over as the operator.

See also
Langeled pipeline
Noweco
Snøhvit

References

External links

Ormen Lange in Aftenbladet Energi Interactive Energy Map,
Ormen Lange (Statoil website)
Ormen Lange (Norske Shell website)
Geological structure of Ormen Lange gas field (in russian)

Natural gas fields in Norway
North Sea energy
Equinor oil and gas fields
Former Ørsted (company) oil and gas fields
Shell plc oil and gas fields
ExxonMobil oil and gas fields